Celestia is a female given name, which is a variant of Celeste, and which means "heavenly" or "of the sky" in Latin. The name may refer to:

Celestia De Lamour (born 1950), Vietnamese religious leader
Celestia Parrish (1853–1918), American educator
Celestia Shambaugh (1881–1971), American educator 
Celestia Taylor (1903–1996), American professor of English

Fictional characters
Princess Celestia (voiced by Nicole Oliver), a character in the TV show My Little Pony: Friendship Is Magic
Celestia Ludenberg, a character from the game Danganronpa: Trigger Happy Havoc

See also
Celeste (disambiguation)
Celestia (disambiguation)
Celestial (disambiguation)

References

English feminine given names
Feminine given names